Postville Airport  is located adjacent to Postville, Newfoundland and Labrador, Canada.

Airlines and destinations

References

External links

Certified airports in Newfoundland and Labrador